Yao Di or Di Yao is the name of:

Emperor Yao ( 24th-century BC/23rd-century BC), mythological ruler of ancient China and one of the Three Sovereigns and the Five Emperors
Yao Di (actress) (born 1982), Chinese actress
Yao Di (volleyball) (born 1992), Chinese volleyball player

See also
Yaodi Subdistrict (窑地街道), a subdistrict in Jianshan District, Yashan, Heilongjiang, China